{{Infobox comics creator
| name          = Yellow Tanabe  
| image         =
| imagesize     = 
| caption       = 
| birth_name    = 
| birth_date    = 
| birth_place   = Tokyo, Japan
| death_date    = 
| death_place   = 
| nationality   = Japanese
| area          = Manga artist
| alias         = 
| notable works = Kekkaishi, Birdmen
| awards        = 52nd Shogakukan Manga Award for shōnen manga for Kekkaishi| manga         = Yes
| website       = 
}}
 is a Japanese manga artist. She was an assistant for Mitsuru Adachi and Makoto Raiku and made her debut in 2002 with the short story Lost Princess. She is best known for the manga series Kekkaishi, which has been adapted as an anime television series and translated into many languages. She published a one-shot story in the inaugural issue of the revival of Monthly Shōnen Sunday in May 2009.

She was born on June 13 in Tokyo, and she graduated from the Musashino Art University. In 2007 she won the Shogakukan Manga Award for shōnen manga for Kekkaishi.

Works
 Kekkaishi (2003–2011) — Serialized in Shogakukan's Weekly Shōnen Sunday Laughter at the World's End (2012) — Serialized in Shogakukan's Weekly Shōnen Sunday Birdmen (2013–2020) — Serialized in Shogakukan's Weekly Shōnen Sunday''

References

External links
 

Living people
People from Tokyo
Manga artists from Tokyo
Women manga artists
Japanese female comics artists
Female comics writers
Year of birth missing (living people)
Japanese women writers
Japanese writers